Louise Nimmo (April 9, 1899 – April 6, 1959) was an American painter. Her work was part of the painting event in the art competition at the 1932 Summer Olympics.

References

1899 births
1959 deaths
20th-century American painters
American women painters
Olympic competitors in art competitions
People from Des Moines, Iowa
20th-century American women artists